The Southern Darter (Sympetrum meridionale) is a species of dragonfly belonging to the Skimmer family Libellulidae.

Description
The wingspan reaches .

The abdomen of adult males is orange-reddish, without black spots on segments.  The sides of the thorax are yellowish-brown. The adult females are quite similar to males, but the background color is more yellow. The wings are hyaline, with yellow or pale brown pterostigma.

Life cycle and behavior
Their life cycle lasts two or three years. They can be encountered from May through mid October in the immediate vicinity of shallow, well vegetated still water, where the larvae develop.

Distribution
This species is present in most of southern Europe.

References

Henrik Steinmann - World Catalogue of Odonata (Volume II Anisoptera) [S. 477f], de Gruyter, 1997, 
 Fauna Europaea
 Biolib

Libellulidae
Insects described in 1841